Sarah Hearst Black (May 4, 1846 – ?) was an American social reformer in the temperance movement. She lived a life of self-denial as a home missionary's wife in Kansas, Nebraska, and Idaho, and served as president of the Woman's Christian Temperance Union (WCTU) in Nebraska.

Early years
Sarah Hearst was born on a farm near Savannah, Ohio, May 4, 1846. Her father's family removed from Pennsylvania to that farm when he was 14 years of age, and Black grew up there. Her ancestors were Scotch-Irish people, all of them members of the Presbyterian Church. Her mother's maiden name was Townsley. Black first attended school in a typical red school-house situated on a corner of her father's farm. At 13 years of age, she began to attend school in Savannah Academy, where she completed a regular course of study. She made a public profession of religion in her 15 year and soon after became a teacher in the Sunday school.

Career
After completing her course of study, she became a teacher, and that was her employment for more than 10 years. In 1878, she married  Rev. J. P. Black, a minister of the Presbyterian Church, and went with him to his field of labor in Pennsylvania. They removed to Kansas in 1880, and since thereafter, she worked as a home missionary's wife in Kansas, Nebraska, and Idaho. She became actively engaged in WCTU work in 1885, in Nebraska, and was elected president of the fifth district of that State for two years in succession. After her removal to Idaho, she was chosen president of the WCTU in that State. She made her home in Nampa, Idaho.

References

Attribution

External links
 

1846 births
American social reformers
Woman's Christian Temperance Union people
People from Ashland County, Ohio
Year of death missing
Wikipedia articles incorporating text from A Woman of the Century